Singha Durbarko Ghumne Mech is a memoir by Dr. Sudha Sharma. Dr. Sharma is an Obstetrician and Gynecologist by profession and served as Secretary at the Ministry of Health and Population (MoHP) from October 2008 to December 2011.

Synopsis 
The book is based on the author's struggle against patriarchal society and bureaucracy of Nepal. It chronicles Dr. Sharma's role as one of the few women secretaries in the government after the 2006 revolution. The book spans over six and a half decades of the author's life.

Release 
It was published on October 17, 2020 by Nepa~laya Publication. It was unveiled by the former President of Nepal, Dr. Ram Baran Yadav. The book was released as a part of Women series of Nepa~laya publication alongside Dumero by Sarala Gautam, Kumari Prashnaharu by Durga Karki and Parityakta by Bhuwan Dhungana.

Reception 
Madan Kumar Bhattarai in his review for The Kathmandu Post called the book as "informative". Shrimak Baral praised the book as "read-worthy and collect-worthy" in his review for eNepalese online magazine.

See also 

 Dumero
 Jiwan Kada Ki Phool
 Kumari Prashnaharu
 Parityakta

References 

Nepalese memoirs
Nepalese books
2020 non-fiction books
Nepalese non-fiction books
Nepalese non-fiction literature